This is the list of number-one tracks on the ARIA Club Chart in 2011, compiled by the Australian Recording Industry Association (ARIA) from weekly DJ reports.

Number-one artists

See also

ARIA Charts
List of number-one singles of 2011 (Australia)
List of number-one albums of 2011 (Australia)
2011 in music

References

Number-one singles
Australia Club Chart
2011 Club